Monique Kerschowski (born 22 January 1988 in Berlin) is a German former footballer who played as a defender. She last played for 1. FFC Turbine Potsdam.

Career 
Kerschowski was a successful track and field athlete, had to retire due to a knee injury in 2000. She then started to play football with her twin sister Isabel. One day when the twins went out to buy football shoes, a manager from the club BSC Marzahn invited them for a practice session. In 2005, they both moved to 1. FFC Turbine Potsdam. A year later, the twins won the European under 19 Championship. Monique scored one goal while her sister scored twice. The Kerschowski twins won this title also in 2007. Monique suffered a severe knee injury in September 2007. Several further injuries let her retire in 2012.

Kerschowski played for Germany at the 2006 and 2008 FIFA U-20 Women's World Championship.

References

External links 
 Official homepage of 1. FFC Turbine Potsdam

1988 births
Living people
German twins
German women's footballers
1. FFC Turbine Potsdam players
Footballers from Berlin
Twin sportspeople
Women's association football defenders